

The Higgins EB-1 is an American helicopter built by Higgins Industries of New Orleans, Louisiana. The EB-1 was originally developed by the Delgado Trade School and completed by Enea Bossi.

Design and development
The EB-1 was a two-seat helicopter with a single four-bladed main rotor and two-bladed anti-torque tail rotor. It had a fixed tricycle landing gear and was powered by a  Warner pressure cooled piston engine. Bossi and the company had ambitious plans for a family of helicopters but in the end only one was built.

Specifications

References

Notes

1940s United States civil utility aircraft
1940s United States helicopters
Aircraft first flown in 1943
Single-engined piston helicopters